Unterkochen station is a railway station in the city of Aalen, located in the Ostalbkreis district in Baden-Württemberg, Germany. The station lies on the Brenz Railway. The train services are operated by SWEG Bahn Stuttgart.

References 

Railway stations in Baden-Württemberg
Buildings and structures in Ostalbkreis